Kent Bridge is a community in the municipality of Chatham-Kent, Ontario, Canada.  It is located between Chatham and Thamesville.

Communities in Chatham-Kent